The Burkinabé Men's Basketball Championship (in French: Championnat du basket-ball hommes du Burkinabé) is the top division basketball league in Burkina Faso. The league is organised by the Burkinabé Basketball Federation (FEBBA) and existed of 20 teams in the 2021–22 season.

Champions 

 2011: Étoile Filante de Ouagadougou
 2016: Rail Club du Kadiogo
 2017: Rail Club du Kadiogo
 2018: Rail Club du Kadiogo
 2019: Rail Club du Kadiogo
 2020: not held
 2021: Académie d'Or des Archers
 2022: AS Sonabhy

Finals

References 

Basketball in Burkina Faso
Basketball leagues in Africa